Carex granularis, the limestone meadow sedge, is a widespread species of flowering plant in the family Cyperaceae, native to Canada and the United States east of the Rockies. As its common name suggests, it prefers wet areas and can tolerate alkaline conditions.

References

granularis
Flora of Saskatchewan
Flora of Manitoba
Flora of Eastern Canada
Flora of Colorado
Flora of the North-Central United States
Flora of the Northeastern United States
Flora of Texas
Flora of the Southeastern United States
Plants described in 1805